Poesoegroenoe Airstrip  serves the village of Poesoegroenoe, in the Sipaliwini District of Suriname.

Charters and destinations 
Charter Airlines serving this airport are:

Accidents or incidents 
 On 21 August 2008 an Overeem Air Service Cessna 207 Skywagon ran off the runway at Poesoegroenoe Airstrip (ICAO: SMPG) during take-off when engine failure occurred. Luckily of the six people on board everyone survived, with only two people minorly injured.

See also

 List of airports in Suriname
 Transport in Suriname

References

External links
Poesoegroenoe Airstrip
OurAirports - Poesoegroenoe
OpenStreetMap - Poesoegroenoe

Airports in Suriname
Sipaliwini District